Francisco Fraga da Silva (born 2 October 1954), known as Chico Fraga, is a Brazilian former footballer who played as a forward. He competed in the men's tournament at the 1976 Summer Olympics and won a gold medal in football at the 1975 Pan American Games.

References

External links
 
 
 

1954 births
Living people
Brazilian footballers
Association football forwards
Brazil international footballers
Olympic footballers of Brazil
Footballers at the 1976 Summer Olympics
Footballers from Porto Alegre
Pan American Games gold medalists for Brazil
Pan American Games medalists in football
Footballers at the 1975 Pan American Games
Medalists at the 1975 Pan American Games